Sherim van Geffen (born 16 July 1993) is a Dutch figure skater who currently competes in ice dance with partner Chelsea Verhaegh. With Verhaegh, he is the 2020 Dutch national champion, and competed at the 2021 World Figure Skating Championships.

Personal life 
Van Geffen was born on 16 July 1993 in Arnhem, Netherlands.

Programs

With Verhaegh

Competitive highlights 
CS: Challenger Series

Ice dance with Verhaegh

References

Dutch male ice dancers
1993 births
Living people
Sportspeople from Arnhem